The 2017 Tampere Open was a professional tennis tournament played on clay courts. It was the 36th edition of the tournament which was part of the 2017 ATP Challenger Tour and the 2017 ITF Women's Circuit. It took place in Tampere, Finland, on 24–30 July 2017.

Men's singles main draw entrants

Seeds 

 1 Rankings as of 17 July 2017.

Other entrants 
The following players received wildcards into the singles main draw:
  Vladimir Ivanov
  Patrick Kaukovalta
  Lauri Kiiski
  Fred Simonsson

The following players received entry from the qualifying draw:
  Juan Ignacio Londero
  Axel Michon
  Ben Patael
  Alexander Vasilenko

The following players received entry as lucky losers:
  Hugo Dellien
  Markus Eriksson

Women's singles main draw entrants

Seeds 

 1 Rankings as of 17 July 2017.

Other entrants 
The following players received wildcards into the singles main draw:
  Ella Haavisto
  Ella Leivo
  Monica Malinen
  Mariella Minetti

The following players received entry from the qualifying draw:
  Monika Kilnarová
  Aleksandra Kuznetsova
  Nelly Mezan
  Gyulnara Nazarova
  Peppi Ramstedt
  Saana Saarteinen
  Kristína Schmiedlová
  Liisa Vehvilainen

Champions

Men's singles 

  Calvin Hemery def.  Pedro Sousa 6–3, 6–4.

Women's singles 
  Monika Kilnarová def.  Marie Benoît, 7–6(7–5), 6–7(5–7), 6–4

Men's doubles 

  Sander Gillé /  Joran Vliegen def.  Lucas Gómez /  Juan Ignacio Londero 6–2, 6–7(5–7), [10–3].

Women's doubles 
  Anna Iakovleva /  Gyulnara Nazarova def.  Marie Benoît /  Estelle Cascino, walkover

External links 
 Official website 

2017
Tampere Open
Tampere Open
Tampere Open
Tampere Open